Justice Owen may refer to:

Daniel Owen (judge), chief justice of the Rhode Island Supreme Court
John Owen (judge), justice of the High Court of England and Wales
Priscilla Owen, circuit judge of the United States Court of Appeals for the Fifth Circuit
Selwyn N. Owen, associate justice of the Supreme Court of Ohio
Walter C. Owen, associate justice of the Wisconsin Supreme Court

See also
Susan Owens, associate justice of the Washington Supreme Court